John Charles Williams (30 April 1861 – 29 March 1939) was an English Liberal Unionist politician and a noted gardener at Caerhays Castle, Cornwall, where he grew and bred rhododendrons and other plants. An important group of camellia cultivars, Camellia × williamsii, was originally bred by him. He also took an interest in the development of new daffodil cultivars.

Early life
He was educated at Rugby School and at Trinity Hall, Cambridge.

Career
In 1882 he acquired the estate of Werrington, then in Devon and since 1974 in Cornwall. He was elected at the 1892 general election as the Member of Parliament (MP) for Truro, and held the seat until he stood down at the 1895 general election. He was High Sheriff of Cornwall in 1888, and Lord Lieutenant of Cornwall from 1918 to 1936.

See also

Williams family of Caerhays and Burncoose

References

External links
 

1861 births
1939 deaths
Alumni of Trinity Hall, Cambridge
English gardeners
High Sheriffs of Cornwall
Liberal Unionist Party MPs for English constituencies
Lord-Lieutenants of Cornwall
Members of the Parliament of the United Kingdom for Truro
People educated at Rugby School
People from St Austell
UK MPs 1892–1895